Sexmission is a 1984 Polish cult comedy science fiction action film. It also contains a hidden political satire layer specific to the time and place of its production (the socialist-feminist system as proposed by the Communist Party), but with relevance still today.

Plot
On 9 August 1991 Maksymilian "Max" Paradys (Jerzy Stuhr), looking for adventure, and Albert Starski (Olgierd Łukaszewicz), biologist,  volunteer themselves for the first human hibernation experiment, created by professor Wiktor Kuppelweiser, a Nobel Prize laureate, who previously successfully hibernated a chimpanzee for half a year. The experiment is considered as an epochal event and is broadcast on television. The hibernation is scheduled to last for 3 years.

Instead of being awakened 3 years later in 1994 as planned, they wake up in the year 2044, in a post-nuclear world. Both are 86 years old, but haven't aged a day outwardly. They are being taken care of by women, which they enjoy at the beginning, especially Max, who becomes attracted to Lamia Reno. After explicitly asking to meet professor Kuppelweiser, they are informed by Lamia and Dr. Berna that he "doesn't exist". They explain that there was a war long ago, that all males have long been extinct, and that it is actually the 8th of March 2044 (Women's Day).The men are under constant surveillance after this. Lamia informs them their society reproduces without males through parthenogenesis. During a briefing, Max kisses Lamia, for which she knocks him down and threatens both men with euthanasia if there is another attempt at sexual assault. However, the kiss causes Lamia's drug-inhibited passions to resurface, making her both confused and fascinated. Due to her internal feelings she goes on a search for the oldest living woman to find out anything she can about the men before the war. She finds 74-year old Julia Novack, who fondly remembers her fiancé and tells Lamia that the old world with two sexes should be restored. She also guesses that Lamia fell in love with one of the men.

After several days, Max and Albert are permitted to go out to meet with Her Excellency, the supreme ruler of women. Waiting for her in the bio-sanctuary, they spot a tree with two tiny apples and eat them, having had enough of synthetic food. At the meeting they ask what womankind did to mankind. The women reply the extinction of men is not their fault, but Kuppelweiser's, who, during the war, invented an agent - the so-called M bomb - which was supposed to temporarily paralyze male genes, but, due to an oversight, instead destroyed male genes permanently. Max offers a proposal: he and Albert will serve as reproducers to restore the male population. However, the women do not wish the old order to return; Her Excellency gestures to the "sacred apple tree" and says it was planted by Arch Mother, and from which, when once in paradise, a male took an apple and seduced a woman with it, by which act paradise was lost to all forever. After noticing the missing sacred apples, Her Excellency becomes desperate and enraged and demands the men be taken back to their previous confinement and not be released anywhere.

Once again confined, the men grow distressed and plan to escape by damaging the electric power grid. They succeed, but are caught during a course organized by the special section on how to interact with men, should they ever return to the world, and are locked up again. The women provide them with their last chance: to submit themselves for "naturalization" - undergoing a sex reassignment surgery. When they refuse, the ceiling above the room opens, showing a huge assembly of women, who are to determine their fate. Albert and Max now face a humiliating trial, while the women blame males for oppression, virtually all evil and vices, and praise their new society. They engage in historical revisionism by claiming that the greatest scientists - such as Copernicus, Einstein and Pincus (one of the pioneers of parthenogenesis) - were, in fact, women. When Max and Albert are taken away, the assembly votes on whether the men should undergo forced 'naturalization' (proposed by group "Archeo") or be 'liquidated' (proposed by group "Genetix"). Naturalization is passed by a margin of only one vote. In the meantime, the men escape again. Wandering through what Albert calls "a nightmarish skyscraper", they encounter other women, who have never seen a man, and therefore view Max and Albert as their "sisters", provoking humorous encounters. After that the men discover a boot lying on the floor, with a bottle of Jabol (a cheap wine popular in Poland in the late 20th century) and a sheet of newspaper from 1993 with stories from the beginning of the world war. They are cornered by the security team and escape down a waste chute. They discover the nest of "decadency" - one of the anarchist, "hippie" women's groups, who do not wish to be part of the oppressive regime, playing loud music, and some engaging in lesbian relations. They mistake Max and Albert for government spies and, in the meantime, the pursuing regime forces attack, and subsequent chaos provides the men with an opportunity to escape. During their escape, the men stumble upon Lamia, who provides them with a way to see the outside - a periscope - and reveals that they live deep underground in expanded old mines. The periscope shows a dark, rocky landscape above ground, and sensors indicate high levels of "Kuppelweiser radiation", a side effect of the M bomb. However, it transpires that Lamia is loyal to "Archeo" group and her "help" was a ruse to capture the men and force them into surgery. Lamia is congratulated by Tekla and Emma Dax (members of "Genetix") for her ingenious plan, but they also inform her that their section will now be in charge of the males, which devastates Lamia.

In the hands of Tekla, the fate of the males is to be different. Their organs will be extracted for transplantation, and their remains will be tested for possible use as a food source, due to a growing protein shortage. The chief surgeon, Dr Yanda, an old lady, is revealed to be Max's daughter, who now delights in taking revenge for his abandonment of his wife and child in favor of hibernation for his own profit. Lamia sabotages the surgery and helps the men escape as revenge for Tekla and Dax taking the men and her research. Shortly after escaping, Albert passes out in the lift from the anaesthetic given to him in theatre, and dreams that he's in 1994, when process of hibernation has successfully finished. In the periscope room Lamia threatens the guards by telling them that she will blast the whole block if they do not give her the code activating a capsule reaching the surface, while Max and Albert find and change into protective suits. The guards claim that only Her Excellency knows the password required; enraged, Max shouts "kurwa mać!" (a common strong Polish profanity, lit. "[your] mother's a whore"), and to the surprise of all present, the capsule is activated. Lamia changes into another protective suit and joins the men. While they explore the barren surface, Max suddenly bumps against an invisible barrier and is unable to go further. He takes a knife and cuts the fabric of the barrier, revealing a dazzling light. They all go through the hole and find themselves on a beach, with the periscope area being surrounded by a small, circular tent-like structure with the barren landscape panorama painted on the inside of the canvas. They explore their surroundings and reach a forest, but the suits are running out of oxygen. Suddenly Max shouts with joy and throws away his suit, pointing skyward to a flying stork and declares "if it can live, it means we can live too". After removing the suits, they come across a cosy villa full of fresh food. While eating in the garden, they are found by Emma, who has been following them and, armed with a harpoon, demands their surrender, but she faints due to the lack of oxygen. Albert removes her helmet and performs CPR on her. He carries her inside the villa and starts to remove her suit. When she regains consciousness, Emma begins to fight with Albert; during their struggle, they accidentally turn on the TV and see an official government broadcast of events, stating that Lamia and Emma are dead and including an interview with "naturalized" Max and Albert, who claim to be feeling very well and thankful. Emma is shocked, unable to understand such lies and all the strange environment "with too much air". Max goes with Lamia to a bedroom and tries to explain to her what mating is, while Albert tries his luck with Emma.

Later, while resting in the living room, Max and Albert suddenly hear the familiar sound of an arriving elevator and hide. It is Her Excellency who emerges from the elevator (which is hidden within a closet) to feed her caged birds. When she opens the wardrobe, she is attacked by Max who was hiding inside. During the ensuing fight, Her Excellency's breasts and hair are stripped, revealing that 'she' is a male in disguise, much to 'her' panic and Max's disgust and rage. Max also removes an electronic necklace, which was converting 'Her' Excellency's voice into one that sounds like a woman's. 'Her' Excellency tells the men his life story - just after the war, when the League of Women took power, he was 4 years old; the few boys remaining were naturalized into girls, but he was hidden by his mother. Growing up in a female disguise, he joined the League and finally was elected 'Her Excellency'. He was too afraid of women to form a relationship with any and, by revealing himself, to try to restore the old order. The government has been exaggerating the radiation level in order to keep the inhabitants underground, making them easier to control; likewise, the inhabitants are medicated to remove sexual desire. The three make a deal: Max and Albert will not compromise 'Her' Excellency's true identity, but they will stay in his home with Lamia and Emma. Later, Max and Albert, disguised as laboratory workers, add male gametes to flasks in the incubation centre. Flashing forward to several months later, a nurse, routinely wrapping newborns in blankets, is horrified to see a penis.

Political and social satire
The film contains numerous subtle allusions to the realities of the communist-bloc society, particularly to that of the People's Republic of Poland just before the fall of communism, perhaps in the anticipation of the major events to come; the fall of communism and the rise of political liberty. When Max and Albert escape, they jump through the wall, which then starts to shake (often associated with later Lech Wałęsa's jumping over the wall of the Gdańsk shipyard, and also with the subsequent fall of the Berlin wall). The secret meeting of the Women's League apparatchiks and their lies to the women parallels the communist government of Poland. This dimension of the movie appears to typically escape the viewer more removed from the context. Some sections of this kind were left out from the version shown in Polish theaters by the government censors, but many passed through.

The movie can also be viewed as a satire directed at intergender conflict (wrong-headed feminism or wrong-headed masculism), prudery, or totalitarianism.

Reception
In a contemporary review, Variety stated that the film was "not up to the standards of those quality Polish pics of the late 1970s [...] nonetheless the best pic to emerge from the Warsaw studios over the past season."

The film has been very popular in Poland. It was proclaimed to be the best Polish film of the last 30 years in a 2005 joint poll by readers of three popular film magazines. However, this assessment by the audience was considered to be a surprise as it disagreed with the historical rankings of Polish movies by the professional film critics. They obvioulsy did not like the openly anti-feminist notions and its connection to totalitarianism. It received the Złota Kaczka award for the best Polish movie of 1984.  The movie was also fairly popular in Hungary when shown a couple of years later.

Two cites from this film, Uważaj, tu mogą być promile! ("Be careful, promiles could be in here!") and Dlaczego tu nie ma klamek? ("Why are there not any handles in here?") were used in Polish dubbing of Shrek 2 and were part of Donkey's role, who was dubbed by Jerzy Stuhr (Max Paradys in Sexmission).

Cast
 Olgierd Łukaszewicz as Albert Starski
 Jerzy Stuhr as Maximilian 'Max' Paradys
 Bożena Stryjkówna as Lamia Reno
 Bogusława Pawelec as Emma Dax
 Hanna Stankówna as dr Tekla
 Beata Tyszkiewicz as dr Berna
 Ryszarda Hanin as dr Jadwiga Yanda
 Barbara Ludwiżanka as Julia Novack
 Mirosława Marcheluk as Secretary
 Hanna Mikuć as Linda
 Elżbieta Zającówna as Zająconna
 Dorota Stalińska as TV Reporter (1991)
 Ewa Szykulska as Instructor
 Janusz Michałowski as Professor Wiktor Kuppelweiser
 Wiesław Michnikowski as Her Excellency

See also
 A.D. 2044, a video game based on the film
 Herland
 Idiocracy, an American film about hibernees who wake up 500 years in the future
 Y: The Last Man
 Assemblywomen, ancient Greek comedy by Aristophanes describing a society ruled entirely by women
 The Gate to Women's Country, a novel about a city-state of women whom a male garrison plots to take over and subjugate
 The Female Man, a multiple universe spanning novel including a world where men have died out in a plague.
 "Lithia", an episode of The Outer Limits with a similar premise
 "Worlds End Harem", a Japanese anime based on the manga of the same name, about a world where men are extinct from a virus and a few male survivors are to repopulate the world.

References

Footnotes

Sources

External links

 
 
 
 Knee-Slappers: Poland’s Most Beloved Comedies

1984 films
1980s feminist films
1980s sex comedy films
1980s science fiction comedy films
1984 LGBT-related films
1980s Polish-language films
Polish LGBT-related films
Polish science fiction comedy films
Cryonics in fiction
1980s dystopian films
Polish post-apocalyptic films
LGBT-related satirical films
LGBT-related science fiction films
Films directed by Juliusz Machulski
Films set in 1991
Films set in 2044
Films set in the future
Films about time travel
Single-gender worlds
1984 comedy films